At the Cinema! is an album by multi-instrumentalist and composer Buddy Collette's Swinging Shepherds, a jazz group featuring four flautists, recorded in early 1959 and released on the Mercury label.

Reception

The Allmusic review by Scott Yanow states: "Assisted by a fine West Coast rhythm section, Collette and his fellow flutists perform concise versions of 11 songs that were used in the movies. The repertoire ranges from standards such as 'Laura,' 'I Can't Believe That You're in Love with Me' and 'Invitation' to a few lesser-known numbers. The treatments are quite respectful but of interest to jazz listeners".

Track listing
 "Colonel Bogey & River Kwai March" (Kenneth J. Alford, Malcolm Arnold) - 3:35
 "Laura" (David Raksin) - 2:37
 "Smile" (Charlie Chaplin) - 3:04
 "The Bad and the Beautiful (Love Is for the Very Young)" (Raksin) - 4:09
 "The Shrike" (Pete Rugolo) - 3:23
 "I Can't Believe That You're in Love with Me" (Jimmy McHugh, Clarence Gaskill) - 2:43
 "The Trolley Song" (Hugh Martin, Ralph Blane) - 1:50
 "Intermezzo" (Rugolo) - 3:25
 "Ruby" (Heinz Roemheld, Mitchell Parish) - 3:20
 "Invitation" (Bronisław Kaper) - 3:52
 "Swinging on a Star" (Jimmy Van Heusen, Johnny Burke) - 2:51

Personnel
Buddy Collette, Paul Horn, Bud Shank - flute, alto flute, piccolo
Harry Klee - flute, alto flute, bass flute
Bill Miller (tracks 1-3, 7 & 9), John Williams (tracks 4-6, 8, 10 & 11) - piano
Jim Hall - guitar
Red Mitchell - bass
Earl Palmer (tracks 1-3 & 7-9), Shelly Manne (tracks 4-6, 10 & 11)  - drums
Buddy Collette, Paul Horn, Pete Rugolo, Bud Shank - arranger

References

Buddy Collette albums
1959 albums
Mercury Records albums